The 10th Chess Olympiad, organized by the FIDE and comprising an open team tournament, as well as several other events designed to promote the game of chess, took place between August 9 and August 31, 1952, in Helsinki, Finland.

The Olympiad was especially notable for the debut of the Soviet team, who instantly won their first gold medals and went on to completely dominate the Olympiads for the next four decades.

After the tournament, it was generally agreed that the small preliminary and final groups of only 8–9 teams left too much open to chance, since a single blunder would have an impact too big on the final standings. Consequently, FIDE decided that in the future, no final should have less than 12 participants.

Results

Preliminaries

Twenty-five teams entered the competition and were divided into three preliminary groups of eight or nine teams. The top three from each group advanced to Final A, the teams placed fourth-sixth to Final B, and the rest to Final C. All groups and finals were played as round-robin tournaments.

Group 1 was won by Argentina, ahead of West Germany and Czechoslovakia. England, Denmark, and Cuba took the following places, while Iceland, Saar, and Luxembourg finished in the bottom third.

Sweden took first place in group 2, ahead of Hungary and Yugoslavia. East Germany, Austria, and Italy took places four through six, while Brazil and Norway finished seventh and eighth.

Group 3 was won by the Soviet Union, well ahead of the United States and the Finnish hosts. Israel, the Netherlands, and Poland took the following places, while Switzerland and Greece finished at the bottom.

Group 1

Group 2

Group 3

Final

{| class="wikitable"
|+ Final A
! # !!Country !! Players !! Points
|-
| style="background:gold;"|1 ||  || Keres, Smyslov, Bronstein, Geller, Boleslavsky, Kotov || 21
|-
| style="background:silver;"|2 ||  || Najdorf, J. Bolbochán, Eliskases, Pilnik, Rossetto || 19½
|-
| style="background:#cc9966;"|3 ||  || Gligorić, Rabar, Trifunović, Pirc, Fuderer, Milić || 19
|-
| 4 ||  || Filip, Pachman, Šajtar, Kottnauer, Zíta, Pithart || 18
|-
| 5 ||  || Reshevsky, Evans, Robert Byrne, Bisguier, Koltanowski, Berliner || 17
|-
| 6 ||  || Szabó, Barcza, Szily, Flórián, Pogáts, Molnár || 16
|-
| 7 ||  || Ståhlberg, Stoltz, Lundin, Sköld, Johansson, Danielsson || 13
|-
| 8 ||  || Teschner, Schmid, Pfeiffer, Heinicke, Lange, Rellstab || 10½
|-
| 9 ||  || Böök, Ojanen, Kaila, Salo, Fred, Niemelä || 10
|}

{| class="wikitable"
|+ Final B
! # !!Country !! Players !! Points !! MP
|-
| 10 ||  || Van Scheltinga, Prins, Donner, Cortlever, Kramer, Barendregt || 21 || 
|-
| 11 ||  || Czerniak, Oren, Porath, Aloni, Mandelbaum || 19½ || 
|-
| 12 ||  || Tarnowski, Pytlakowski, Plater, Śliwa, Litmanowicz, Grynfeld || 16½  || 10
|-
| 13 ||  || Koch, Pietzsch, Platz, Müller || 16½  || 7
|-
| 14 ||  || Enevoldsen J., Poulsen, Nielsen, Pedersen, Enevoldsen H. || 16  || 
|-
| 15 ||  || Alemán, Planas, Gonzáles, Cobo Arteaga, Ortega || 15  || 
|-
| 16 ||  || Golombek, Penrose, Milner-Barry, Barden, Horne, Hooper || 14  || 
|-
| 17 ||  || Lokvenc, Poschauko, Beni, Auer, Palda, Keller || 13 || 
|-
| 18 ||  || Porreca, Nestler, Scafarelli, Calà, Primavera || 12½ || 
|}

{| class="wikitable"
|+ Final C
! # !!Country !! Players !! Points !! MP !! Head-to-head
|-
| 19 ||  || German, Souza Mendes, Mangini, Carvalho jr., Cruz Filho, Vasconcellos || 18½ || || 
|-
| 20 ||  || Gaitanaros, Tsiknopoulos, Mastihiadis, Anagnostou, Sakellaropoulos, Zografakis || 13½ || || 
|-
| 21 ||  || Vestøl, Myhre, Morcken, Rojahn, Ramm, Madsen E. || 13  || 6 || 2½
|-
| 22 ||  || Grob, Müller, Morel, Bachmann P., Bhend || 13 || 6 || 1½
|-
| 23 ||  || Gilfer, Ólafsson, Johnsen, Sigurðsson, Gíslason, Arnlaugsson || 12½  || 8 || 
|-
| 24 ||  || Lorson, Benkner, Weichselbaumer, Jost F., Jacob || 12½  || 5 || 
|-
| 25 ||  || Doerner, Levy, Lambert H., Kremer, Barbier || 1 || || 
|}

Final A

Final B

Final C

Individual medals

 Board 1:  Miguel Najdorf 12½ / 16 = 78.1%
 Board 2:  Vassily Smyslov 10½ / 13 = 80.8%
 Board 3:  David Bronstein 8 / 10 = 80.0%
 Board 4:  Čeněk Kottnauer 12½ / 15 = 83.3%
 1st reserve:  Héctor Rossetto 8 / 10 = 80.0%
 2nd reserve:  Ludwig Rellstab 6½ / 9 = 72.2%

References

10th Chess Olympiad: Helsinki 1952 OlimpBase

10
Olympiad 10
Chess Olympiad 10
Olympiad 10
Chess Olympiad 10
1950s in Helsinki
August 1952 sports events in Europe